Baru is a commune in Hunedoara County, Transylvania, Romania. It is composed of four villages: Baru, Livadia (Mezőlivádia), Petros (Petrosz) and Valea Lupului (Farkaspatak).

References

Communes in Hunedoara County
Localities in Transylvania
Țara Hațegului